The 2016 Melbourne Storm season was the 19th in the club's history, they competed in the 2016 NRL season and were coached by Craig Bellamy, coaching for  his 14th consecutive season during which he coached his 350th Game. Melbourne Storm were also captained in 2016 by Cameron Smith, who was the sole captain for the team since 2008 making this his 9th consecutive season. In the pre-season the Storm competed in the 2016 Auckland Nines tournament, reaching the semi-finals.

Storm kicked off the season with three straight wins despite playing below their best. Marika Koroibete scored a double in a season-opening win against the Dragons while Will Chambers did the same the following week in a 34-16 triumph over the Gold Coast. Two losses soon followed against the Sharks and Bulldogs before a Round 7 golden point-win over Wests Tigers saw Melbourne hit their straps. Cooper Cronk's 85th minute field goal in that game kick-started a stellar run for Storm that saw them win 13 of their next 14 games to move into top spot on the NRL ladder. Cronk went on to play his 300th NRL game in a Preliminary final later in the season – becoming just the 25th player to reach that mark. The team managed to do that whilst also experiencing one of the longest injury lists the Club has seen. With their outside back stocks all but depleted, Cheyse Blair, rookie Suliasi Vunivalu and mid-season signing Ryan Morgan were all handed Storm debuts.

For the first time in the Club's history, Storm kept their opponents scoreless in consecutive weeks, first on ANZAC Day against the Warriors (42-0) then the Titans a week later (38-0). Round 10 saw the Melbourne take part in the first ever NRL Double Header in front of 52,347 fans at Suncorp Stadium – the largest non-finals crowd of the season. That night Cameron Smith helped Storm to a thrilling one-point win over the Cowboys with a field goal in the 71st minute. Melbourne then went through the Origin period with a 5-1 record, its best performance during that part of a season in six years. Big away wins over the Roosters and Broncos by 46 and 42 points respectively were the highlights. Vunivalu scored three tries that night against Brisbane to make it 16 tries from his opening 10 games. The 20-year-old ultimately finished with 23 for the season to finish the year as the NRL's leading try scorer and break Storm's try-scoring record. The final game of the season saw the men in purple clinch the Club's first Minor Premiership since 2011 with a 26-6 win over Cronulla. They backed up their efforts in Week One of the finals, defeating reigning premiers North Queensland 16-10. After earning a week off, Craig Bellamy's side booked their place in a sixth Grand Final in 11 years, narrowly defeating the Canberra Raiders 14-12. That game also broke a new record for Storm as it was the first time in history the Club recorded four consecutive home crowds of 20,000-plus.

Storm then gave their absolute all against the Sharks in the Grand Final and took the lead with 15 minutes to play. However, they were ultimately pipped for the top prize, going down 14-12.

Season summary 
Pre-season- New recruits took part in Melbourne Storm IDQ camp for pre season training before New Years.  Dale Finucane was awarded the IDQ Iron bar.
 Auckland Nines – The club commenced their 2016 season competing in the annual Auckland Nines competition on 6–7 February 2016. For the first time they made it past the pool stage, winning their first two games. They also won their quarter final before losing the semi final to eventual winner Parramatta Eels. Blake Green captained a youthful squad with an average age of just 22, with assistant coach Adam O'Brien handling coaching responsibilities.
 4 March - Craig Bellamy announces that he has signed a 2-year contract extension with the club meaning his coaching tenure will continue until the end of the 2018 season.
 Round 1 - The Storm won their 12th consecutive first round encounter, with Marika Koroibete scoring two tries playing in his 50th NRL game. Billy Slater  re-injures his shoulder ruling him out for the rest of the season.
 Round 2 - Storm have a commanding victory over the Titans with Curtis Scott making his NRL debut.
 Round 3 - Storm remain the only unbeaten side in the NRL after a win over Warriors in New Zealand.
 Round 5 - Storm score their 300th win in the NRL coming from behind to defeat the Newcastle Knights.
 Round 6 - Fijian Suliasi Vunivalu became the 171st player to debut for the Storm and in his debut game scored two tries including one in the first minute of the match.
 Round 9 - The Storm demolish the Gold Coast Titans 38-0 in a very one-sided game, this was the second consecutive week that the Storm have kept a side scoreless. This game marked Craig Bellamy's 350th NRL Game as coach, and also Cheyse Blair's debut for the Storm. In addition the game was notable for the fact that in only his third game, Suliasi Vunivalu scored two tries for the third consecutive week.
 Round 10 - The Storm defeat reigning premier's North Queensland Cowboys 15-14 in their "home" game at Brisbane's Suncorp Stadium. Cameron Smith kicked only the second field goal of his career to break the deadlock.
 19 May - Winger Marika Koroibete announces that he will leave the Storm at the end of the season and switch to Super Rugby side Melbourne Rebels.
 Round 11 - Ryan Morgan makes his debut for the Storm against his old club the Parramatta Eels after being granted an immediate release from the Eels following their salary cap scandal.
 Round 14 - The Storm demolish the Sydney Roosters away in a record breaking win. Records that fell in this game were:
 It was the Storm's biggest win against the Roosters, 
 The first time the Roosters were kept tryless against the Storm
 Roosters worst defeat against any side at Allianz Stadium. 
 First time three tries has been scored by a Storm player this season
 Most points scored by a Storm player in a game this season
 Round 15 - Brodie Croft makes his playing debut and Suliasi Vunivalu becomes the NRL leading try scorer - to date, scoring 2 tries in the Storm's loss to St George Illawarra.
 Round 17 - Melbourne Storm complete a record breaking win over the Brisbane Broncos defeating them 48-6 in what was their 10th win in 11 matches at Suncorp Stadium. Records that fell were:
 Largest ever win over Broncos.
 Brisbane's biggest ever defeat at Suncorp Stadium against any side.
 Melbourne's highest score thus far this season.
 Cameron Smith scoring 8 goals from 8 attempts scored the most points in a game thus far this season.
 Round 19 - Matt White made his playing debut, in the Melbourne Storm's narrow win over Newcastle.
 Round 20 - Jesse Bromwich played his 150th Game against the Storms win over the Sydney Roosters.
 Round 21 - Marika Koroibete plays his 50th Game.
 5 August - Cooper Cronk signs a new two-year contract extension that will almost certainly see him finish his career with the Storm.
 Round 22 - The Storm defeat the South Sydney Rabbitohs 15-14 with a field Goal in Golden point extra time, moving to first place on the NRL table. The win came after scoring a penalty goal in the 80th minute to level the scores.
 Round 24 - Suliasi Vunivalu scores 4 tries in the Storms big win over Manly and in doing so registered the following records:
 equaled the club record for most tries scored in a game 
 equaled the club record for most tries scored in a season 
 equaled the NRL record for most tries scored in a rookie season
 Round 26 - The Storm defeat the Cronulla Sharks in front of a sold-out crowd of 24,135 spectators to claim the minor Premiership. Suliasi Vunivalu also scored his 22nd try for the season claiming the outright record for most tries scored in a season for a Melbourne Storm player. Tohu Harris also played his 100th Game.
 Finals Week 1 - The Storm defeat the North Queensland Cowboys to earn a weeks break and a home Preliminary Final in Week 3.
 Finals Week 3 - Cooper Cronk played his 300th Game in the home Preliminary final win against Canberra. The win earned the Storm a place in the 2016 NRL Grand Final. The crowd of 28,161 was also the Storms highest home crowd of the season and also their fifth highest ever home attendance.
 Finals Week 4 - The 2016 NRL Grand Final was and closely fought game and after the Cronulla Sharks won the first half and led 8-0 at half time, the Storm came back to hit the front in the second half 12 - 8 before the sharks scored the match winning try and winning the game 14 - 12. The final went right down to the final minutes with the Storm falling only metres short of scoring a try in the final few seconds. The Grand Final also marked Melbourne Storm's 500th NRL Game.

Milestone games

Fixtures

Pre-Season 

Source:

Regular season

Source:
 GP – golden point extra time

Finals

Ladder

2016 Coaching Staff
 Head coach: Craig Bellamy
 Assistant coaches: Adam O’Brien & Jason Ryles
 Development coaches: Marc Brentnall & Aaron Bellamy
 Specialist coaches: Nick Maxwell (leadership) & Craig McRae (skills)
 Director of Performance: Dean Benton
 Performance coaches: Adam Basil (conditioning), Daniel Di Pasqua (strength) & Tim Rogers (rehabilitation)
 Training & Logistics Manager: Matthew Barradeen
 Football Director: Frank Ponissi
 Head physiotherapist: Meirion Jones
 Physiotherapist: Andrew Nawrocki
 Club Doctor: Jason Chan
Academy & Affiliate
 Storm Academy: Matt Adamson
 Under 20s Coach: Eric Smith
 Sunshine Coast Falcons Coach: Craig Ingebrigsten
 Easts Tigers Coach: Scott Sipple
Reference:

2016 Squad
As of 20 July 2016

Player movements

Source:

Losses
 Matt Duffie to Blues (rugby union)
 Kurt Mann to St George Illawarra Dragons
 Ryan Hinchcliffe to Huddersfield Giants
 Mahe Fonua to Hull F.C.
 Hymel Hunt to South Sydney Rabbitohs
 Tom Learoyd-Lahrs to Retirement 
 Charnze Nicoll-Klokstad to New Zealand Warriors
 Shaun Nona to Released
 Dayne Weston to Leigh Centurions

Gains

 Matthew White from Gold Coast Titans
 Mark Nicholls from Canberra Raiders
 Scott Drinkwater from Sydney Roosters
 Nafe Seluini from Sydney Roosters
 Curtis Scott from Cronulla Sharks
 Cheyse Blair from Manly Sea Eagles
 Ryan Morgan from Parramatta Eels

Representative honours
The following players have played a representative match in 2016. (C) = Captain

(a) - Felise Kaufusi was selected as the 18th Man for Queensland in State of Origin Game 3 but did not play. 
(b) - includes the AUS vs NZL pre-tournament game to be played in Perth prior to travelling to England

Statistics 
Statistics Source: Complete as of the end of the 2016 Regular season, (these stats do not include finals).

Scorers

Most Points in a Game: 16 points 
 Round 17 - Cameron Smith (8 Goals) vs Brisbane Broncos
 Round 24 - Suliasi Vunivalu (4 Tries) vs Manly Sea Eagles

Most tries in a Game: 4 
 Round 24 - Suliasi Vunivalu vs Manly Sea Eagles

Winning Games

Highest score in a winning game: 48 points
 Round 17 vs Brisbane Broncos

Lowest score in a winning game: 14 points
 Preliminary Final vs Canberra Raiders

Greatest winning margin: 46 points
 Round 14 vs Sydney Roosters

Greatest number of Games won consecutively: 7
 Round 7 to Round 14

Losing Games

Highest score in a losing game: 16 points
 Round 25 - vs Brisbane Broncos

Lowest score in a losing game: 6 points
 Round 4 - vs Cronulla Sharks

Greatest losing margin: 14 points
 Round 23 - vs Canberra Raiders

Jersey
In November 2015 the Melbourne Storm signed a new 5-year deal with Melbourne-based manufacturer STAR. New Home and Away jerseys have been designed for the upcoming season. The Home jersey is predominantly Navy Blue at the Top and morphing into purple as you move down the jersey, the lightning bolts also make a return on the sides of the jersey. The Away jersey is a striking white top with a Navy Blue and Purple V across the chest.

^ Alternate sponsor logo used due to New Zealand restrictions on gambling advertising.
^^ Added ANZAC Appeal and RSL Centenary logos.
# Designed by Lenny Briggs and Dixon Patten.
% Replica of 2000 World Club Challenge jersey, also worn in Round 5 2000 at the MCG.
& Women in League jersey — mostly pink and purple design.

Awards

Trophy Cabinet
2016 J. J. Giltinan Shield
 2016 Michael Moore Trophy

Melbourne Storm Awards Night
Held at Docklands, Melbourne on Friday 7 October 2016.
 Melbourne Storm Player of the Year: Jesse Bromwich
 Melbourne Storm Rookie of the Year: Suliasi Vunivalu
 Suzuki Members' Player of the Year:  Cameron Smith
 Melbourne Storm Most Improved: Cameron Munster
 Melbourne Storm Best Forward: Cameron Smith
 Melbourne Storm Best Back: Cooper Cronk
 Feeder Club Player of the Year Award: Joe Stimson
 Darren Bell U20s Player of the Year Award: Louis Geraghty
 U20s Best Forward: Lachlan Timm
 U20s Best Back: Jesse Arthars
 Greg Brentnall Young Achievers Award: Ben Nakubuwai
 Mick Moore Club Person of the Year: Adam O’Brien
Life Member Inductees: Brian Phelan (Welfare Manager)

Dally M Awards Night
Melbourne Storm players walked away from rugby league's Dally M awards on 28 September 2016 with a total of six Dally M awards.

 Dally M Medal- Cooper Cronk 
 Dally M Representative Player of the Year: Cameron Smith
 Dally M Halfback of the Year: Cooper Cronk
 Dally M Prop of the Year: Jesse Bromwich
 Dally M Hooker of the Year: Cameron Smith
 Dally M Top Try Scorer: Suliasi Vunivalu

RLPA Awards Night
RLPA New Zealand Representative Player of the Year: Jesse Bromwich

Rugby League World Golden Boot
On 22 December 2016, Cooper Cronk won the 2016 Rugby League World Golden Boot Award (Worlds best player).

Additional Awards
 I Don’t Quit Iron Bar: Dale Finucane
Wally Lewis Medal: Cameron Smith
Rugby League Four Nations Player of the Series: Cooper Cronk
Spirit of ANZAC Medal: Tohu Harris
Auckland Nines Team of the Year: Tohu Harris
QRL Peter Jackson Memorial Award: Billy Slater
 New Zealand Kiwi player of the Year: Jesse Bromwich

References

Melbourne Storm seasons
Melbourne Storm season